Mango is a census-designated place (CDP) in Hillsborough County, Florida, United States. The population was 11,313 at the 2010 census, up from 8,842 at the 2000 census.

Geography
Mango is located north of the geographic center of Hillsborough County at  (27.989333, -82.304395). It is bordered to the north by Thonotosassa, to the east by Seffner, to the south by Brandon, and to the west by East Lake-Orient Park. Interstate 4 forms the northern boundary of the CDP, and Interstate 75 is the western boundary. The main road through the center of Mango is Dr. Martin Luther King Jr. Boulevard (Florida State Road 574).

Demographics

At the 2000 census there were 8,842 people, 3,289 households, and 2,302 families residing in the community. The racial makeup of the community was 86.97% White, 6.44% African American, 0.58% Native American, 0.72% Asian, 0.05% Pacific Islander, 2.40% from other races, and 2.85% from two or more races. Hispanic or Latino of any race were 9.16%.

Of the 3,289 households, 37.0% had children under the age of 18 living with them, 46.0% were married couples living together, 17.1% had a female householder with no husband present, and 30.0% were non-families. 22.1% of households were one person, and 6.2% were one person aged 65 or older.  The average household size was 2.68 and the average family size was 3.10.

In the community the population was spread out, with 29.1% under the age of 18, 8.7% from 18 to 24, 32.8% from 25 to 44, 21.0% from 45 to 64, and 8.4% 65 or older.  The median age was 33 years. For every 100 females, there were 100.8 males.  For every 100 females age 18 and over, there were 96.3 males.

The median household income was $33,989 and the median family income was $37,818. Males had a median income of $29,038 versus $22,947 for females. The per capita income for the community was $15,478.  About 9.1% of families and 12.6% of the population were below the poverty line, including 20.1% of those under age 18 and 4.0% of those age 65 or over.

By 2010 the census showed 11,313 people, a 28% increase over 2000.

Population change by race:

Schools

Public schools

Elementary schools
Mango Elementary School

See also
Mango-Seffner, Florida, a single census area recorded during the 1980 Census.

References

Census-designated places in Hillsborough County, Florida
Census-designated places in Florida